State Route 175 (SR 175) is a state highway in the U.S. state of California that runs through the Mayacamas Mountains, connecting U.S. Route 101 in Hopland in Mendocino County with State Route 29 in Middletown in Lake County.

Route description
SR 175 connects U.S. Route 101 at Hopland to State Route 29 near Lakeport through the Mayacamas Mountains. From there it joins SR 29 until Kelseyville, where it loops out until meeting SR 29 again at its end at Middletown. The section between Hopland and Lakeport is also known locally as the "Hopland Grade", or "Hopland Pass."

Except for the portion on SR 29, SR 175 is not part of the National Highway System, a network of highways that are considered essential to the country's economy, defense, and mobility by the Federal Highway Administration.

History
Originally constructed in the early 1920s, it is one of the steepest and most difficult to drive of any California state highway. Until recently it was called the "crookedest road in California".

Major intersections

See also

References

External links

California @ AARoads.com - State Route 175
Caltrans: Route 175 highway conditions
California Highways: SR 175

State Route 175
175
State Route 175